Bowens is an unincorporated community located at the crossroads of MD routes 506 and 508 in Calvert County, Maryland, United States.

References

Unincorporated communities in Calvert County, Maryland
Unincorporated communities in Maryland